Sir Ralph William Frankland Payne-Gallwey, 3rd Baronet (1848–1916) was an English engineer, historian, ballistics expert, and artist.

Life
The son of Sir William Payne-Gallwey, 2nd Baronet, and his wife Emily Anne, a daughter of Sir Robert Frankland-Russell, 7th Baronet, the young Payne-Gallwey was educated at Eton College. In 1881, he inherited from his father the Thirkleby Hall estate in the North Riding of Yorkshire.

He married Edith Alice Usborne. Their son William Payne-Gallwey was a soldier and first-class cricketer who was killed in action during the First World War. As a result of that, Payne-Gallwey decided to sell his Yorkshire estate.

Works
Payne-Gallwey began by writing books on sport. Early works included The Book of Duck Decoys (1886) and Letters to Young Shooters (1892). His The Crossbow appeared in 1903, and his High Pheasants in Theory and Practice in 1913. In later life, he also turned to history and current affairs, with The Mystery of Maria Stella, Lady Newborough (1907), A History of the George Worn on the Scaffold by Charles I (1908) and The War, A Criticism (June, 1915). This was an appeal for conscription to be brought in, to greatly increase the size of the British Army.

Publications 
 The Crossbow, Mediaeval and Modern, Military and Sporting; its Construction, History and Management, with a Treatise on the Balista and Catapult of the Ancients (London: Longmand Green & Co., 1903; reprinted by Holland of London, 1958; new edition by Skyhorse Publishing, 2007)
 The Fowler in Ireland, or Notes on the Haunts and Habits of Wildfowl and Seafowl: Including Instructions in the Art of Shooting and Capturing Them
 The Book of Duck Decoys: Their Construction, Management, and History (London: John van Voorst, 1886) 
 Letters to Young Shooters (1892) 
 The Mystery of Maria Stella, Lady Newborough (London: Edward Arnold, 1907)
 A History of the George Worn on the Scaffold by Charles I (London: Edward Arnold, 1908)
 High Pheasants in Theory and Practice (London and New York: Longmans, Green & Co., 1913)
 The War, A Criticism (London: Spottiswoode & Co., 1915)

Notes

External links
 
The Book of Duck Decoys by Sir Ralph Payne-Gallwey, 1886 (full text)
The War: a crticism, 1915 (full text)

Baronets in the Baronetage of the United Kingdom
Writers from Yorkshire
People educated at Eton College
Rifle Brigade officers
Gordon Highlanders officers
People from North Yorkshire
1848 births
1916 deaths